Cammerer may refer to:

 Mount Cammerer, a mountain on the Great Smoky Mountains, south-eastern United States
 Arno B. Cammerer (1883–1941), the 3rd director of the U.S. National Park Service
 Helmut Cämmerer (1911–?), German sprint canoer
 Cämmerer See, lake in Mecklenburg-Vorpommern, Germany

See also
 Kammerer